Ellice is a former provincial electoral division in the Canadian province of Manitoba.  It was created by redistribution in 1979 and eliminated in 1989.

The riding was located in west-central Winnipeg, in the area of the future Minto and St. James ridings.

List of provincial representatives

Election results

References

Former provincial electoral districts of Manitoba